John K. "Jack" Rafferty (May 1, 1938 – February 17, 2021) was an American politician who served as the Mayor of Hamilton Township, New Jersey from 1976 to 1999 and in the New Jersey General Assembly from the 14th Legislative District from 1986 to 1988.

Early life and education
Rafferty was born on May 1, 1938 to Mae Knox Rafferty and Francis Peter Rafferty, a tool and die maker. His family were Irish, Catholic, and supporters of the Democratic Party. He later described his father as a "dyed-in-the-wool" Democrat.

After leaving the Navy, he received an associate in arts degree from Trenton Junior College. He graduated from La Salle University with a pre-law degree in 1963 and then received his Juris Doctor degree from University of Kentucky College of Law in 1966.

After law school, Rafferty clerked for U.S. District Court Judge George H. Barlow and worked as a legal analyst for the New Jersey Division of Taxation. Governor William T. Cahill appointed Rafferty as Director of the Division of Administrative Procedure. He left state government in 1974, upon the inauguration of Democratic Governor Brendan Byrne.

Political career
Rafferty made his first run for political office in 1968, when he was an unsuccessful candidate for Mercer County Freeholder.

In 1969, Rafferty was elected to the Hamilton Township council. He was the first Republican elected to the council in 19 years. He served for six terms.

In 1971, Rafferty ran for the New Jersey Assembly to represent Hamilton, Trenton, and Washington Township (District 6B). He ran to fill the seat left vacant by Joseph Merlino. He and Republican running mate Peter Rossi lost the race for the multi-member district to Hamilton recreation director Francis J. McManimon and incumbent S. Howard Woodson.

In 1976, Rafferty won the first open election for mayor of Hamilton following the ratification of the township's new charter, becoming the first Republican mayor of the township in 26 years. He attended the 1976 Republican National Convention as a delegate pledged to President Gerald Ford.

In 1980, after appeals from John P. Sears, Rafferty agreed to serve as the director of Ronald Reagan's New Jersey campaign. Rafferty claimed that he only agreed to serve on the Reagan campaign once he was satisfied that he and Reagan were "philosophically compatible in their politics." Rafferty considered himself a "moderate" Republican who was "moderate-to-liberal" on some issues. After Sears was ousted as Reagan's campaign manager, Rafferty was replaced by Raymond J. Donovan.

Following the indictment of incumbent U.S. Representative Frank Thompson, Rafferty was approached to run for the seat in 1980, replacing lesser-known Republican nominee Chris Smith. Rafferty declined.

In 1981, Rafferty ran for Governor of New Jersey. He hoped to capitalize on his association with now-President Reagan, but finished a distant seventh in the Republican primary, which was won by eventual Governor Thomas Kean. After the primary, Kean considered Rafferty for chairman of the New Jersey Republican Party, but the job was ultimately given to Philip D. Kaltenbacher.

In 1985, while still serving as Mayor, Rafferty was elected to the New Jersey Assembly amid a Republican wave election. He unseated incumbent Joseph D. Patero. He served one term and did not run for re-election in 1987. Rafferty intended to challenge Francis McManimon for State Senate in 1987, but after polling showed that both his Assembly seat and mayoral seat were at risk, he refocused on his work as mayor.

In 1999, Rafferty retired rather than run for re-election to a seventh term as Mayor.

Retirement
After retiring from office, Rafferty remained active in local politics and served as executive director of the Hamilton Partnership, a business group that promotes cooperation among its members and works with the township to attract more businesses to town. He was elected to the New Jersey Republican Party State Committee in 2017.

Personal life
Rafferty married Doris Tramontana, with whom he had two children, Megan and Daniel.

Death
Rafferty died on February 17, 2021, in Hamilton Township, New Jersey at age 82.

References

1938 births
2021 deaths
Republican Party members of the New Jersey General Assembly
Mayors of places in New Jersey
People from Hamilton Township, Mercer County, New Jersey
Politicians from Mercer County, New Jersey
New Jersey lawyers
Military personnel from New Jersey
Mercer County Community College alumni
La Salle University alumni
University of Kentucky College of Law alumni